Tap(s), TAP(S) or tapped may refer to:

Arts and entertainment

Film
 Tap (film), a 1989 film
 Taps (film), a 1981 American drama film 
 Taps (2006 film), a short film 
 Tapped (film), a 2009 documentary

Gaming
 Tap, a Magic: The Gathering keyword
 Tap (gaming), a game where an object, such as a ball, is caught and thrown 
 Tapping, creating an artificial lag, a method of cheating in online games
TapTap Video game distribution platform

Music and dancing
 Spinal Tap (band), a parody band
 Tap dance, a type of dance using the sounds of tap shoes striking the floor 
 Tapping, a guitar playing technique 
 "Taps" (bugle call), a U.S. armed forces bugle call
 Tap: Book of Angels Volume 20, a 2013 album by Pat Metheny composed by John Zorn

Publications
 Tap!, a defunct magazine for owners of Apple's iOS devices
 The American Prospect, a liberal policy magazine based in Washington, D.C.
 TAP, a Youth International Party magazine
 TAP (novelette), by Greg Egan, 1995

Businesses and organisations
 TAP Air Portugal, Portugal's flag carrier airline
 TAP Digital Media Ventures Corporation, a Philippine media and entertainment company
 TAP Pharmaceuticals, a joint venture 
 The Atlantic Paranormal Society (TAPS), an organization that investigates reported paranormal activity
 Secret Polish Army, Tajna Armia Polska, a Polish resistance movement in World War II 
 Molson Coors Brewing Company, NYSE symbol TAP
 Tunis Afrique Presse, a Tunisian news agency
 TAP Boyz (The Arabian Posse), a Chicago street gang
 Tasmanians Against the Pulpmill, a group opposing the Bell Bay Pulp Mill
 TAPS Division, Informatics General,  an American computer software company 
 Trafficking and Prostitution Services (TAPS), an organisation for sexual trafficking victims
 Tragedy Assistance Program for Survivors (TAPS), a U.S. non-profit organization

Medicine
Procedures involving fluid removal through a needle:
 Lumbar puncture, also known as a spinal tap
 Paracentesis, also known as an abdominal tap
 Thoracentesis / thoracocentesis, also known as a pleural tap

People
 Tap Canutt (1932–2014), American stunt performer and actor
 Taps Mugadza (born 1988), Zimbabwean singer known by the mononym Taps
 Taps Miller (1915–?), American entertainer

Places
 Tap, Azerbaijan
 Táp, Hungary

Science and technology

Engineering
 Tap (valve), a device for controlling the release of a liquid or gas, e.g. a water faucet
 Beer tap
 Tap (transformer), an intermediate point on the winding of an electrical transformer
 Tap and die, tools to create screw threads

Computing and communications
 Tap (signal processing), a delayed impulse response
 Network tap (terminal access point), a system that monitors events on a local network 
 Telephone tap, a device that monitors phone conversations
 Telelocator Alphanumeric Protocol, a protocol for sending messages to a cellular or pager service
 Test Anything Protocol, a communication protocol 
 Topfield Application Program, a software application for digital TV
 Tap, a pointing device gesture
 Test access port in JTAG standard
 Amazon Tap, a portable version of the Amazon Echo voice assistant
 TUN/TAP, virtual network kernel interfaces
 .TAP files: for tape files from original C64, VIC-20 and C16 tapes, see Commodore 64 disk / tape emulation; for Transferred Account Procedure data files, see Roaming
 Task-based asynchronous pattern (TAP), Microsoft's term for the Async/await pattern in C#

Science
 Tap consonant, a type of phonetic sound
 TAPS (buffer), a chemical compound commonly used to make buffer solutions
 Tandem affinity purification (TAP), a technique for studying protein interactions
 Timor–Alor–Pantar languages
 Transporter associated with antigen processing (TAP), a protein complex
 Twin anemia-polycythemia sequence (TAPS),  a form of chronic inter-twin transfusion

Transportation
Trans Adriatic Pipeline (TAP), a gas pipeline via Greece, Albania and Italy
Trans-Alaska Pipeline System (TAPS), a petroleum pipeline across Alaska, United States
 Transit Access Pass (TAP), an electronic ticketing payment method in Los Angeles County, California, United States
 Tapachula International Airport, Chiapas, Mexico, IATA airport code TAP
 Tai Po Market station, Hong Kong, MTR station code TAP

Other uses
 Tap code, a simple way to encode text messages on a letter-by-letter basis
 Tap, a method of contactless payment
 Tarapur Atomic Power Station (TAPS), Tarapur, Palghar, India
 Trans Adriatic Pipeline (TAP), a gas pipeline 
 Trans-Alaska Pipeline System (TAPS), a crude-oil pipeline
 Tuition Assistance Program, New York State, U.S.
 Tap, or Tab (cuneiform), a cuneiform sign 
 Tap room, in a British bar

See also
 
 
 Tapping (disambiguation)
 Tap out (disambiguation)
 Tap tap (disambiguation)